SEPTA Route 66 is a trackless trolley route in Northeast Philadelphia, Pennsylvania, United States. It connects the Market–Frankford Line at the Frankford Transportation Center to Wissinoming, Mayfair, Holmesburg, and Torresdale along Frankford Avenue, which is US 13 and includes the historic, colonial Frankford Avenue Bridge.

The route's eastern terminus is at City Line Loop, located at Frankford Avenue and Knights Road in Morrell Park. However, some weekday trips are truncated to Gregg Loop, located at Gregg Street and Frankford Avenue.  Some weekday rush hour service begin/end at Frankford and Cottman Ave in the city's Mayfair neighborhood.

The route is operated by trolleybuses, locally called trackless trolleys. Buses replaced streetcars (trolley cars) on July 30, 1955 and ran for one month then on September 1, 1955, the new Trackless Trolleys replace the buses. The last day of streetcar operation was actually July 30, 1955, but diesel buses were temporarily used for six weeks.

Diesel buses were substituted beginning June 2002 because of reconstruction of Frankford Depot (garage) and the adjacent Market-Frankford "El" viaduct and station, but trackless service was restored in April 2008.

All of the vehicles currently in use are ADA-compliant and equipped with bicycle racks. "Night Owl" service is also available, and rush hour service includes both local and express trips.

See also

Trolleybuses in Philadelphia

References

External links
SEPTA Route 66 (Official schedule and map)
Flickr Photo

66
66
66